Alexander Mikhailovich Pushnitsa (1 November 1949 – 27 January 2023) was the most titled sambist in history of Sambo, Merited Master of Sports of the USSR (1980), nine-time champion of the USSR (1974, 1975, 1976, 1977, 1978, 1979, 1980, 1983, 1984), two-time European champion (1976, 1984) and three-time winner of the world championships (1974, 1979, 1983). He was a permanent captain of the Soviet Union Sambo team for 15 years. In 1997 in Paris he won the European Championship for Sambo Veterans. A graduate of the Omsk State Institute of Physical Culture (1987). Honorary Citizen of the city of Omsk. Deputy Chairman of Sambo Federation of the Omsk region, head of the sports school Sambo 2000. Since 2000 annual open Russian Sambo tournament is held in Omsk for the prizes of Alexander Pushnitsa.

Biography
Alexander's father and mother were rural teachers. Alexander grew up in a village. He liked to fight since childhood. Boys usually fought on the ground, not observing any rules. Most often Alexander struggled with his twin brother Vladimir [subsequently International Master of Sports in Sambo and three-time bronze medalist (1977, 1978, 1982) of the USSR Championships]. There was no television in that village, and the brothers knew nothing about Sambo. Father of Alexander and Vladimir, a veteran of World War II, instilled in them a love of peasant labor and sports. Brothers loved not only to fight, but also cross-country skiing, playing soccer and hockey. Alexander was endowed with agility, endurance, speed, tenacity, determination and patience. His desire to win competitions began to manifest itself in early childhood. When he was fifteen, Alexander began to win in the village self-made championships. Adult men participated in those competitions. In the final fight Alexander usually met with his brother Vladimir.

Labor way
1964–1968 —  A Mechanic (Temirtau); 
1968–1970 —  Served in the Soviet Army; 
1970–1971 —  Concrete Worker (Frunze); 
1971–1973 —  Inspector of Investigation Group (Frunze); 
1973–1993 —  Inspector of Combat and Physical Training (Omsk);
1993–2023 — Sambo coach, head of the sports club Sambo 2000 (Omsk).

Sports path
Alexander started training Sambo while serving in the Soviet Army (1968). 

In 1971 he became Master of Sports of the USSR.

In 1980 he was awarded the title of Merited Master of Sports of the USSR.

Results of competitions

1973 — Champion of sports society Dynamo (USSR).

1974 — World Champion and Champion of the USSR.

1975 — Champion of the USSR.

1976 — European Champion and Champion of the USSR.

1977 — Champion of the USSR.

1978 — Champion of the USSR.

1979 — World Champion and Champion of the USSR.

1980 — Champion of the USSR.

1981 — Bronze Medalist of the USSR Championship.

1982 — Silver Medalist of the USSR Championship.

1983 — World Champion and Champion of the USSR.

1984 — European Champion and Champion of the USSR.

1986 — Silver Medalist of the USSR Championship.

1987 — Silver Medalist of the USSR Championship.

The style of fighting

Famous Sambo coach Yevgeny Chumakov (the most successful disciple of Anatoly Kharlampiev) said that the style and the results of fights of Alexander Pushnitsa  best propaganda of Sambo in the international sports arena.

References

1949 births
2023 deaths
Honoured Masters of Sport of the USSR
Russian sambo practitioners
Soviet martial artists
Siberian Academy of Physical Culture alumni
Sportspeople from Novosibirsk Oblast
Sportspeople from Omsk